Jane McCafferty is an American novelist, and short story writer.

Life
Her stories have appeared in Alaska Quarterly Review, Seattle Review, Glimmer Train, Story, Witness.  She teaches at Carnegie Mellon University. She lives in Pittsburgh, Pennsylvania and has two daughters.

Awards
 National Endowment for the Arts Fellowship
 1993 Great Lakes New Writers award 
 1992 Drue Heinz Literature Prize, for Director of the World

Works

Novels
 
 First You Try Everything. New York: Harper, 2012

Short Stories

Anthologies

References

External links
"Author Jane McCafferty", NPR

Year of birth missing (living people)
Living people
American women short story writers
American short story writers
21st-century American novelists
American women novelists
Carnegie Mellon University faculty
21st-century American women writers
Novelists from Pennsylvania